The 2019 Swiss Open (officially known as the Yonex Swiss Open 2019 for sponsorship reasons) was a badminton tournament which took place at St. Jakobshalle in Basel, Switzerland, from 12 to 17 March 2019 and had a total purse of $150,000.

Tournament
The 2019 Swiss Open was the seventh tournament of the 2019 BWF World Tour and also part of the Swiss Open championships which had been held since 1955. This tournament was organized by the Swiss Badminton and sanctioned by the BWF.

Venue
This international tournament was held at St. Jakobshalle in Basel, Switzerland.

Point distribution
Below is the point distribution table for each phase of the tournament based on the BWF points system for the BWF World Tour Super 300 event.

Prize money
The total prize money for this tournament was US$150,000. Distribution of prize money was in accordance with BWF regulations.

Men's singles

Seeds

 Shi Yuqi (champion)
 Chen Long (semi-finals)
 Viktor Axelsen (withdrew)
 Anthony Sinisuka Ginting (semi-finals)
 Jonatan Christie (second round)
 Tommy Sugiarto (first round)
 Lin Dan (quarter-finals)
 Sameer Verma (second round)

Wild card
Swiss Badminton awarded a wild card entry to Christian Kirchmayr of Switzerland.

Finals

Top half

Section 1

Section 2

Bottom half

Section 3

Section 4

Women's singles

Seeds

 Chen Yufei (champion)
 He Bingjiao (withdrew)
 Saina Nehwal (withdrew)
 Sung Ji-hyun (semi-finals)
 Beiwen Zhang (semi-finals)
 Michelle Li (second round)
 Mia Blichfeldt (withdrew)
 Evgeniya Kosetskaya (quarter-finals)

Finals

Top half

Section 1

Section 2

Bottom half

Section 3

Section 4

Men's doubles

Seeds

 Li Junhui / Liu Yuchen (withdrew)
 Kim Astrup / Anders Skaarup Rasmussen (first round)
 Mohammad Ahsan / Hendra Setiawan (quarter-finals)
 Fajar Alfian / Muhammad Rian Ardianto (champions)
 Liu Cheng / Zhang Nan (first round)
 Marcus Ellis / Chris Langridge (semi-finals)
 Berry Angriawan / Hardianto (second round)
 Lee Yang / Wang Chi-lin (final)

Finals

Top half

Section 1

Section 2

Bottom half

Section 3

Section 4

Women's doubles

Seeds

 Chen Qingchen / Jia Yifan (quarter-finals)
 Gabriela Stoeva / Stefani Stoeva (semi-finals)
 Nami Matsuyama / Chiharu Shida (final)
 Chang Ye-na / Jung Kyung-eun (champions)
 Maiken Fruergaard / Sara Thygesen (withdrew)
 Li Wenmei / Zheng Yu (semi-finals)
 Émilie Lefel / Anne Tran (first round)
 Selena Piek / Cheryl Seinen (withdrew)

Finals

Top half

Section 1

Section 2

Bottom half

Section 3

Section 4

Mixed doubles

Seeds

 Chris Adcock / Gabby Adcock (withdrew)
 Marcus Ellis / Lauren Smith (quarter-finals)
 Mathias Christiansen / Christinna Pedersen (quarter-finals)
 Mark Lamsfuß / Isabel Herttrich (quarter-finals)
 Lu Kai / Chen Lu (semi-finals)
 Niclas Nøhr / Sara Thygesen (withdrew)
 Marvin Seidel / Linda Efler (second round)
 Rinov Rivaldy / Pitha Haningtyas Mentari (final)

Finals

Top half

Section 1

Section 2

Bottom half

Section 3

Section 4

References

External links
 Tournament Link

Swiss Open (badminton)
Swiss Open
Swiss Open
Swiss Open (badminton)